NA-34 Nowshera-II is a constituency for the National Assembly of Pakistan. The constituency was formerly known as NA-5 Nowshera-I from 1977 to 2018. The name changed to NA-26 (Nowshera-II) after the delimitation in 2018 and to NA-34 Nowshera-II after the delimitation in 2022.

Members of Parliament

1977–2002: NA-5 Nowshera-I

2002–2018: NA-5 Nowshera-I

2018-2023: NA-26 Nowshera-II

Elections since 2002

2002 general election

A total of 2,153 votes were rejected.

2008 general election

A total of 2,701 votes were rejected.

2013 general election

A total of 4,521 votes were rejected.

2013 By-election
The member elected in the 2013 General Election, Pervez Khattak, decided to vacate this seat. This resulted in a by-election being triggered, which took place on 22 August 2013.

2018 general election 

General elections were held on 25 July 2018.

2023 By-election 
A by-election will be held on 16 March 2023 due to the resignation of Imran Khattak, the previous MNA from this seat.

See also
NA-33 Nowshera-I
NA-35 Kohat

References

External links 
 Election result's official website

26
26